Trágame Tierra is the second studio album by American musician Jonathan Bates under his solo project Big Black Delta. It was released in April 2016 under Master of Bates Records.

Track list

References

2016 albums
Big Black Delta albums